Yaupon Beach, North Carolina is a neighborhood of the coastal town of Oak Island in Brunswick County, North Carolina.

History
Yaupon Beach was incorporated as a town in 1955. The town was named for the abundance of yaupon near the original town site. It has weathered many hurricanes, including Hazel in 1954 and Floyd in 1999. It merged with neighboring Long Beach in 1999 to form the town of Oak Island.

References

Populated places established in 1955
Populated places disestablished in 1999
Geography of Brunswick County, North Carolina
Annexed places in North Carolina
Former municipalities in North Carolina
Unincorporated communities in North Carolina
1955 establishments in North Carolina